Major General (Ret.) Kivlan Zen is an Indonesian former military officer who was the chief of staff of KOSTRAD (Army Strategic Command). He led the XVII Garuda Contingent on 1990 in the Philippines. He served as an aide to Prabowo Subianto, the former commander of Kopassus.

Early life

Kivlan Zen born on December 24, 1946, in Langsa, Aceh. He is the alumni of Akmil in 1971.

References 
 "Jalan Politik Jenderal Kontroversial" Tokohindonesia.com

1946 births
Living people
Indonesian generals
Indonesian National Military Academy alumni
People from Langsa